Marcelle Bory (born 1908, date of death unknown) was a French fencer. She competed in the individual women's foil competition at the 1924 Summer Olympics.

References

External links
 

1908 births
Year of death missing
French female foil fencers
Olympic fencers of France
Fencers at the 1924 Summer Olympics